This is a list of Legionnaires' disease outbreaks; Legionnaire's is a potentially fatal infectious disease caused by gram negative, aerobic bacteria belonging to the genus Legionella. The first reported outbreak was in Philadelphia, Pennsylvania in 1976 during a Legionnaires Convention at the Bellevue-Stratford Hotel.

An outbreak is defined as two or more cases where the onset of illness is closely linked in time (weeks rather than months) and in space, where there is suspicion of, or evidence of, a common source of infection, with or without microbiological support (i.e. common spatial location of cases from travel history).

Worldwide listings by year

1960s

1970s

1980s

1990s

2000s

2010s

2020s

Governmental controls to prevent outbreaks

Regulations and ordinances
The guidance issued by the UK government's Health and Safety Executive (HSE) now recommends that microbiological monitoring for wet cooling systems, using a dipslide, should be performed weekly. The guidance now also recommends that routine testing for legionella bacteria in wet cooling systems be carried out at least quarterly, and more frequently when a system is being commissioned, or if the bacteria have been identified on a previous occasion.
Further non-statutory UK guidance from the Water Regulations Advisory Scheme now exists for pre-heating of water in applications such as solar water heating systems.

The City of Garland, Texas, United States requires yearly testing for legionella bacteria at cooling towers at apartment buildings.

Malta requires twice yearly testing for Legionella bacteria at cooling towers and water fountains. Malta prohibits the installation of new cooling towers and evaporative condensers at health care facilities and schools.

The Texas Department of State Health Services has provided guidelines for hospitals to detect and prevent the spread of nosocomial infection due to legionella.
The European Working Group for Legionella Infections (EWGLI) was established in 1986 within the European Union framework to share knowledge and experience about potential sources of Legionella and their control. This group has published guidelines about the actions to be taken to limit the number of colony forming units (i.e., the "aerobic count") of micro-organisms per mL at 30 °C (minimum 48 hours incubation):

Almost all natural water sources contain Legionella and their presence should not be taken as an indication of a problem. The tabled figures are for total aerobic plate count, cfu/ml at 30 °C (minimum 48 hours incubation) with colony count determined by the pour plate method according to ISO 6222(21) or spread plate method on yeast extract agar. Legionella isolation can be conducted using the method developed by the US Center for Disease Control using buffered charcoal yeast extract agar with antibiotics.

Copper-Silver ionization is an effective industrial control and prevention process to eradicate Legionella in potable water distribution systems and cooling towers found in health facilities, hotels, nursing homes and most large buildings. In 2003, ionization became the first such hospital disinfection process to have fulfilled a proposed four-step modality evaluation; by then it had been adopted by over 100 hospitals. Additional studies indicate ionization is superior to thermal eradication.

A 2011 study by Lin, Stout and Yu found Copper-Silver ionization to be the only Legionella control technology which has been validated through a 4-step scientific approach.

It was previously believed that transmission of the bacterium was restricted to much shorter distances. A team of French scientists reviewed the details of an epidemic of Legionnaires' disease that took place in Pas-de-Calais in northern France in 2003–2004. There were 86 confirmed cases during the outbreak, of whom 18 died. The source of infection was identified as a cooling tower in a petrochemical plant, and an analysis of those affected in the outbreak revealed that some infected people lived as far as 6–7 km from the plant.

A study of Legionnaires' disease cases in May 2005 in Sarpsborg, Norway concluded that: "The high velocity, large drift, and high humidity in the air scrubber may have contributed to the wide spread of Legionella species, probably for >10 km."

In 2010 a study by the UK Health Protection Agency reported that 20% of cases may be caused by infected windscreen washer systems filled with pure water. The finding came after researchers spotted that professional drivers are five times more likely to contract the disease. No cases of infected systems were found whenever a suitable washer fluid was used.

Temperature affects the survival of Legionella as follows:

 : Disinfection range
 At : Legionellae die within 2 minutes
 At : They die within 32 minutes
 At : They die within 5 to 6 hours
 Above : They can survive but do not multiply
 : Ideal growth range
 : Growth range
 Below : They can survive but are dormant

Removing slime, which can carry legionellae when airborne, may be an effective control process.

See also 
 Legionnaire's Disease
 Pontiac fever
 1976 Philadelphia Legionnaires' disease outbreak

References

External links 
 
 

American Legion
Building biology
Legionellosis Outbreaks
Legionellosis Outbreaks
Industrial hygiene
Outbreaks
Legionnaires' disease outbreaks
Disease outbreaks
2005 disasters in Canada
2012 disasters in Canada